Mills Valley is an ice-filled valley indenting the east side of Pain Mesa between Biretta Peak and the Diversion Hills, in the Mesa Range, Victoria Land, Antarctica. It was mapped by the United States Geological Survey from surveys and U.S. Navy air photos, 1960–64, and was named by the Advisory Committee on Antarctic Names for Commander Norman J. Mills, U.S. Navy Reserve, officer in charge of the Detachment A winter party at McMurdo Station, 1967.

References

Valleys of Victoria Land
Pennell Coast